Matthias Bachinger was the defending champion but decided not to participate.

Tobias Kamke won the title defeating Flavio Cipolla in the final 6–2, 7–5.

Seeds

Draw

Finals

Top half

Bottom half

References
 Main Draw
 Qualifying Draw

Aegon Pro-Series Loughborough - Singles
2011 Men's Singles